Lesbian, gay, bisexual, and transgender (LGBT) persons in the U.S. state of New Mexico enjoy most of the same rights as non-LGBT people. New Mexico has seen prominent advances in lesbian, gay, bisexual, and transgender (LGBT) rights in recent decades. Same-sex sexual activity has been legal since 1975. Same-sex marriage is legal statewide in New Mexico, as is adoption and access to fertility treatments for lesbian couples. Same-sex couples now enjoy the same rights as heterosexual married couples. Discrimination on the basis of sexual orientation and gender identity is banned statewide in the areas of employment, housing and public accommodations. Additionally, conversion therapy on minors is prohibited in the state.

The state capital, Santa Fe, is often cited as one of the United States' gay capitals, and the state's largest city Albuquerque, including its large metropolitan area, is often referred to as a "gay-friendly" city. Opinion polls have shown that a majority of New Mexicans support LGBT rights and same-sex marriage; 2018 polling from the Public Religion Research Institute showed that 73% of New Mexicans supported anti-discrimination legislation protecting LGBT people.

History

In modern-day New Mexico, Native American people groups include the Navajo, the Zuni, the Apache, the Tewa, the Tiwa, and the Keres people. Similarly to many Native American tribes in the United States, these groups have traditions of cross-dressing and gender variance and had perceptions of gender and human sexuality different from that of the Western world. There were no legal or social punishments for engaging in same-sex sexual activity.

Nádleehi ( or nádleehé; literally one who constantly transforms) refers to individuals who are a "male-bodied person with a feminine nature". Historically, the Navajo recognized four gender roles: asdzáán (feminine female), hastiin (masculine male), dilbaa (masculine female), and nádleehi (feminine male). The nádleehi identity is fluid, and such individuals may display both male and female characteristics. Due to the perceived "balance" between both sexes, they were typically chosen for certain societal and communal roles, such as spiritual healers. They would traditionally wear female clothes and do female work, and some would have sexual relations with men which was accepted by the tribe. The Zuni people also recognize these types of gender roles. The terms lhamana (literally behave like a woman) refers to people assigned male at birth but who typically dress, act and behave as female, and katsotse refers to female-bodied people who live and behave as male. Other tribes have similar individuals, known as ńdé?isdzan among the Mescalero Apache, lhunide among the Tiwa people, kwido among the Tewa, kokwimu among the Acoma and Laguna pueblos, and kokwima among the San Felipe, Santa Ana and Kewa pueblos. Nowadays, the term "two-spirit" is increasingly used to refer to these identities. As a result of colonization, much of this cultural acceptance has disappeared. Even among the Native Americans, societal perceptions began to change. Owing to the introduction of a more stringent set of beliefs on gender and sexuality by the colonizers, Navajo nádleehi became the subject of ridicule. Today, LGBT Navajo may find it difficult being accepted by their family, with 70% of LGBT Navajo youth reportedly attempting suicide. Spanish missionaries took repeated notes of these traditions, with one Franciscan missionary stating "that these accursed people will disappear with the growth of the missions. The abominable vice will be eliminated to the extent that the Catholic faith and all the other virtues are firmly implanted there, for the glory of God and the benefits of these poor ignorants". Among the Hopi, Christian converts were prohibited from attending the traditional snake dance because "male cross-dressing could be observed". Jonathan Ned Katz notes, "the Christianization of Native Americans and the colonial appropriation of the continent by white, Western 'civilization' included the attempt by the conquerors to eliminate various traditional forms of Indian homosexuality—as part of their attempt to destroy that Native culture which might fuel resistance—a form of cultural genocide involving both Native Americans and gay people". Will Roscoe in his work The Zuni Man-Woman writes that the "prevalence of sodomy" and the tolerance or even respect of transgender people fueled the Spanish explorers' argument for the colonization of native peoples and their lands in the name of Christianity.

Shortly following the creation of the New Mexico Territory, the Territorial Legislature passed a law adopting the common law in criminal cases in 1851, thus making sodomy a capital offense. In 1876, the territory's first sodomy law was enacted, providing a penalty of at least one year imprisonment and/or a fine of 1,000 dollars, with no established maximums. As was the case for most of the United States at the time, the statute prohibited both homosexual and heterosexual sodomy, and applied to consenting adults as well. In 1953, the New Mexico Supreme Court held that fellatio was not outlawed by the state's sodomy statute. Two year later, the New Mexico Legislature reworded the sodomy statute to include acts of fellatio. The penalty was set at 10 years' imprisonment. In 1967, in the case of State v. Putman, the New Mexico Court of Appeals held that cunnilingus was criminal under state law—again whether heterosexual or homosexual.

Legality of same-sex sexual activity
New Mexico repealed its anti-sodomy law in 1975, making it one of the first U.S. states to do so.

The first attempt at repealing the state's sodomy law occurred in 1961. The bill passed the House of Representatives by a vote of 37 to 28, but was not successful in the Senate. The proposed bill uniquely referred to anal sex and oral sex as "variant sexual practices" rather than "deviate" as was commonly the case in U.S. state statutes at the time.

In 1972, Judge Lewis R. Sutin, dissenting in the case of State v. Trejo, described the sodomy law as "unconstitutional and void because it is vague, overbroad, uncertain, and is an unreasonable exercise of the police power of the state." He went on to ask if it does not

An attempt to reinstate the sodomy law failed in 1986.

Recognition of same-sex relationships

State marriage laws do not explicitly require married couples to be of different genders and prior to December 2013 state courts had not ruled on the question of same-sex marriage. New Mexico has never recognised alternative relationship recognition schemes, such as civil unions or domestic partnerships. In January 2011, state Attorney General Gary King issued an opinion that valid same-sex marriages contracted in other states "would likely be valid in New Mexico".

On December 19, 2013, the New Mexico Supreme Court ruled that the state must provide same-sex couples with the same marriage rights as different-sex couples, making New Mexico the 17th U.S. state to recognize same-sex marriage.

New Mexico has provided benefits to same-sex partners of state employees since 2003.

In March 2019, the New Mexico Legislature passed a bill in both chambers unanimously (62–0 in the House and 39–0 in the Senate) to codify same-sex marriage in state statutes. The bill was signed into law in April by Governor Michelle Lujan Grisham and went into effect on July 1, 2019.

Adoption and parenting
New Mexico allows single persons to adopt children. The state has no prohibition on adoption by same-sex couples or second-parent adoptions, and as stated, allows those adoptions.

Lesbian couples can access in vitro fertilization and donor insemination without regard to their sexual orientation or marital status. State law recognizes the non-genetic, non-gestational mother as a legal parent to a child born via donor insemination, irrespective of the marital status of the parents. In addition, no statute or case law prohibits surrogacy. As a result, both gestational and traditional surrogacy are practiced in the state, and such contracts are generally recognized by the courts.

In June 2012, following the separation of a lesbian couple, the state's highest court granted parental rights to the one who had been unable to adopt her partner's adopted child but who had helped raise and had supported the child financially.

Discrimination protections

Since the passage of An Act Relating to Human Rights, which became effective on July 1, 2003, New Mexico law has outlawed unfair discrimination based on sexual orientation and gender identity "in matters of employment, housing, credit, public accommodations and union membership." An executive order issued by Governor Toney Anaya in 1985 prohibits discrimination in public employment on the basis of sexual orientation.

In June 2012, a three-judge panel of the New Mexico Court of Appeals unanimously upheld a claim against a photography studio that refused to take pictures of a same-sex couple's commitment ceremony in 2006. On August 22, 2013, the New Mexico Supreme Court upheld that ruling in a unanimous decision in Elane Photography v. Willock. It held that enforcing the anti-discrimination provisions of state law did not violate the photographer's free speech rights. The U.S. Supreme Court announced it would not consider an appeal in the case on April 7, 2014.

In March 2019, the New Mexico Legislature passed a bill in both chambers unanimously (59–0 in the House and 36–0 in the Senate) to repeal an explicit "15 or more employees" exemption, which had exempted businesses with less than 15 employees from the state's anti-discrimination law. The bill was signed into law by Governor Michelle Lujan Grisham and went into effect on July 1, 2019.

In March 2023, a bill passed the New Mexico Legislature to remove loopholes and explicitly include local entities and counties - to prevent discrimination and human rights violations within New Mexico. The Governor of New Mexico is yet to either sign or veto the bill.

Hate crime law
Since 2003, New Mexico's hate crime law has directly and explicitly addressed violence and hate crimes committed solely based on the victim's or victims' actual or perceived race, religion, color, ancestry, national origin, gender, sexual orientation or gender identity.

Bullying in schools
In March 2019, the New Mexico Legislature passed a bill to protect students in state schools from bullying on the basis of sexual orientation and gender identity. The bill passed the House by a vote of 65–0 and the Senate by a vote of 33–14. It was signed into law in April by Governor Michelle Lujan Grisham and went into effect on July 1, 2019. The legislation requires school districts to adopt policies prohibiting bullying and cyberbullying, as well as procedures for reporting and investigation, disciplinary consequences, implementing prevention programs and training for all staff.

Transgender rights
Transgender people are allowed to change their legal gender in New Mexico. Prior to November 2019, the New Mexico Department of Vital Records would issue an amended birth certificate upon receipt of "a statement signed under penalty of perjury by the person in charge of an institution or from the attending physician indicating that the sex of an individual born in this state has been changed by surgical procedure, together with a certified copy of an order changing the name of the person." Since November 1, 2019, New Mexico has issued corrected birth certificates to transgender people without the requirement that they undergo surgery or other medical operations. They need simply to submit a completed "Request to Change Gender Designation on a Birth Certificate" form and pay the applicable fees. Minors require parental consent as well. Applicants for a corrected driver's license and ID must submit a "Request for Sex Designation Change" form with the Motor Vehicles Division.

In March 2019, a bill passed the New Mexico Legislature by a supermajority to repeal the 1984 sex reassignment surgery requirement. The bill would also explicitly provide a "neutral" sex designation, known as "X", alongside male and female, on birth certificates, driver's licenses and state IDs. The bill was passed 26–13 in the House and 33–14 in the Senate. It was signed into law by Governor Michelle Lujan Grisham and went into effect on November 1, 2019.

In March 2019, a bill passed the New Mexico Legislature to allow gender-neutral bathrooms. The bill was passed 54–12 in the House and 23–15 in the Senate. It was signed into law by Governor Michelle Lujan Grisham and went into effect on July 1, 2019. The measure requires New Mexico businesses and public facilities that have single-occupancy restrooms to mark them as gender-neutral, available to any person regardless of gender identity or sex.

In March 2023, a bill (HB7) formally passed the New Mexico Legislature and was signed into law by the Governor of New Mexico - to legally codify, protect and defend "gender affirming care, abortion and sexual reassignment surgery" for any individuals who want it on request without restrictions.

In March 2023, a bill (HB31) passed the New Mexico Legislature to formally repeal the archaic and outdated requirement to publish a formal change of legal name on a birth certificate within a newspaper - the current laws potentially risks the privacy, safety and lives of transgender individuals within the state. The Governor of New Mexico is yet to either sign or veto the bill.

Conversion therapy

In 2017, Senator Jacob Candelaria and Representative G. Andres Romero sponsored SB 121, which would ban sexual orientation change efforts (conversion therapy) on minors. The New Mexico Senate approved the bill on February 16, 2017 by a 32–6 vote, and the New Mexico House of Representatives concurred on March 15, 2017 by a 44–23 vote. The bill was signed by Governor Susana Martinez on April 7, 2017, and went into effect immediately.

Gay panic defence
In the 2019 New Mexico legislative session, a bill to abolish the gay panic defence was passed unanimously by the New Mexico Senate by a vote of 40–0. However, the New Mexico House of Representatives took no action on the bill before it adjourned sine die on March 20. No similar bill was introduced in the 2020 New Mexico legislative session.

On January 31, 2021, another bill was introduced to repeal the gay panic defense. The bill passed by a vote of 41-0 in the Senate; however, the House again took no action on the bill again before it adjourned sine die. Legislation would need to be re-introduced in the 2022 legislative session.

In February 2022, the New Mexico Legislature passed an omnibus crime bill (HB68 - that also added amendments that repeals the common-law gay and trans panic defence). The New Mexico Governor Michelle Lujan Grisham signed the bill into law on March 9, 2022.

LGBT data bill and executive order
In March 2021, a bill (SB316) “lapsed and died” due to not passing through the New Mexico Legislature within the 60-day session. However in August 2021, the Governor of New Mexico signed and implemented an executive order instead - for the immediate establishment and keeping of LGBT data, statistics, demographics and/or records (collected from LGBT New Mexico residents).

Public opinion
A 2017 Public Religion Research Institute poll found that 63% of New Mexico residents supported same-sex marriage, while 30% were opposed and 7% were unsure. Additionally, 64% supported an anti-discrimination law covering sexual orientation and gender identity. 27% were opposed.

Summary table

References

LGBT rights in New Mexico